BBC Breakfast is the BBC television breakfast news programme. Produced by BBC News, the programme is broadcast on BBC One and the BBC News channel. The simulcast is presented live, originally from the BBC Television Centre, London before moving in 2012 to MediaCityUK in Salford, Greater Manchester. The programme is broadcast daily and contains a mixture of news, sport, weather, business and feature items.

Pre-BBC Breakfast history
Breakfast Time was the first BBC breakfast programme, with Ron Neil as producer. It was conceived in response to the plans of the commercial television company TV-am to introduce a breakfast television show. Breakfast Times first broadcast was on 17 January 1983, and was presented by Frank Bough, Selina Scott and Nick Ross. The atmosphere of the set was intended to encourage a relaxed informality; the set mimicked a living-room rather than a studio, with red leather sofas, and Bough and Ross wearing jumpers and open-necked shirts. Ron Neil sought to make it part of the viewers' morning routine, with cookery, exercises, and (to some controversy) even an astrologer Russell Grant. Breakfast Time lasted 150 minutes, initially being transmitted between 6:30am and 9:00am, before moving to a 6:50am to 9:20am slot on 18 February 1985.

Ron Neil  departed from the programme and on 10 November 1986 a more conventional news focus was introduced featuring a news desk, presenters in suits and a shortened broadcast that began at 7:00am and ended any time between 8:30am and 8:55am. Presenters included Kirsty Wark, John Stapleton, Jeremy Paxman and Sally Magnusson.

On 2 October 1989, the programme was renamed BBC Breakfast News and followed a more authoritative tone with a set modelled on the conventional desk style of news bulletins, starting at 6:30am. The programme had been planned to start in September but was postponed due to delays with the set. The first edition was presented by Nicholas Witchell and Jill Dando.

The business news coverage extended to an hour-long programme in its own right called “Business Breakfast” in January 1993, beginning at 6:00am, while BBC Breakfast News started at 7:00am. In April 1993, both programmes moved to the then sixth floor N2 studio in a set used for the One, Six and Nine O'Clock News, using the new computer generated virtual set. Composer George Fenton reworked the theme tune for the Silicon Graphics CGI, title sequences were designed in-house by the BBC and the set was built by Television Production Design Ltd. A further revamp occurred in June 1997, when the programme was renamed simply Breakfast News.

BBC Breakfast history
On 2 October 2000, the merging of separate breakfast programmes, BBC One and BBC News 24, into one single simulcast called Breakfast started, with the first show hosted by Sophie Raworth and Jeremy Bowen. The studio was replaced with a new set in 2003.

Since 3 April 2006, the BBC News channel has returned to its traditional format (starting at 8:30am) while Breakfast continues on BBC One until 9:15am. In April 2008, BBC News 24 was renamed "BBC News", as part of a £550,000 rebranding of the BBC's news output, complete with a new studio and presentation.

On 2 May 2006, Breakfast moved into studio N6 at Television Centre with other BBC One news programmes that required a larger set design that included walls of Barco video screens. The original screen scenes of cirrus clouds on a blue sky were changed as a result of viewer comments that 'it looked too cold'—their replacement was with orange squares of the same design as those appearing in the programme's new title sequence, which were designed to hide any joins or faults between the screens which had previously been obvious. The screens eventually displayed visuals needed for story content: different backgrounds, graphics and still photographs. More importantly, the set had a generic visual style that could be used for other programmes, such as the national news bulletins, without much additional physical change. The programme celebrated its 20th anniversary on 17 January 2003.

On 28 January 2008, Breakfast returned to the TC7 studios, where Breakfast Time had been based following its move from the BBC Lime Grove Studios. On 2 March 2009, Breakfast relaunched with a new set and studio background. The backdrop resembled that of the BBC News channel as did the new Breakfast titles. In May 2009 as part of cost-cutting, the live broadcasts of the business news from the London Stock Exchange were dropped.

In July 2010, the BBC announced that Breakfast was moving to their new studios in Salford Quays. The BBC announced that with the April 2012 move to Salford, co-presenter Sian Williams and sports presenter Chris Hollins preferred not be included in the move to the North of England. Williams left Breakfast on 15 March 2012.

On 12 December 2011, the first of several presenter changes was announced. Louise Minchin would, with the studio move to Salford, join the other main presenters of BBC Breakfast: Bill Turnbull, Susanna Reid and Charlie Stayt. Carol Kirkwood, on 26 March 2012, would remain in London presenting weather. Sports presenters Mike Bushell and Sally Nugent and business presenter Steph McGovern would locate to Salford. The first Breakfast edition from Salford occurred on Tuesday 10 April 2012. London-based newspapers have reported extensive criticism of the BBC move, but a decrease in audience did not occur, with the retention of an approximate average of 1.5 million viewers.

The 2012 Summer Olympics prompted BBC Breakfast to temporarily broadcast from a temporary studio near the Olympic Park in Stratford. During the Games, former presenters Sian Williams and Chris Hollins also returned to lead the morning programme, in addition to Bill Turnbull, Charlie Stayt, Louise Minchin, and BBC Sport presenter Hazel Irvine. The show ended its temporary London return with broadcasting from the BBC News Channel's studio on the morning following the closing ceremonies before rebroadcasting from Salford the next day.

On 19 March 2013, BBC Breakfast updated its "lower thirds" to match the graphics and fonts used by the rest of BBC News since the previous day. The clock was consequently moved to the lower right side of the screen.

In 2014, Susanna Reid left the programme to join a revamped Good Morning Britain on ITV. Naga Munchetty became a regular presenter, hosting with Charlie Stayt from Thursday- Saturday every week, after a number of years as a relief presenter, including regularly presenting Sunday's programme.

On 23 July 2014, the show went on location again, this time to Glasgow to showcase highlights from the 2014 Commonwealth Games. In the hours leading up to the opening ceremony, Carol Kirkwood reported from Celtic Park. The day after the end of the Games, Charlie Stayt presented from Glasgow Cathedral in the lead up to ceremonies marking 100 years since the start of World War I.

In February 2016, Bill Turnbull left the programme and was replaced by Dan Walker.

For the 2016 Summer Olympics, the programme was again renamed Olympic Breakfast and was anchored by Salford and Rio broadcasting from the BBC Sport studio.

In September 2019, Naga Munchetty was initially ruled to have breached the BBC's guidelines by criticising US President Donald Trump for perceived racism. That July, while presenting BBC Breakfast, Munchetty had taken issue with Trump's comments telling his opponents to "go back" to the "places from which they came". Munchetty said: "Every time I have been told, as a woman of colour, to go back to where I came from, that was embedded in racism. Now I'm not accusing anyone of anything here, but you know what certain phrases mean." Several public figures, including Lenny Henry and Adrian Lester, signed an open letter asking the corporation to revisit its ruling against her. It was later reported in The Guardian that the complaint was also made against her co-host Dan Walker, but his comments were not the focus of the BBC's executive complaints unit (ECU) investigation, due to the complainant's follow up complaint focusing solely on Munchetty. Later that day, the Director-General of the BBC Tony Hall overturned the decision after looking into it personally.

In June 2021, Louise Minchin announced she would be leaving BBC Breakfast, 20 years after she joined the programme. Her final show was on 15 September 2021. From 20 September, Sally Nugent co-hosted alongside Dan Walker. On 27 October 2021, Sally Nugent announced that she would permanently join the programme as the new Monday-Wednesday presenter. It was announced on 4 April 2022 that Dan Walker would be leaving Breakfast to join ITN to be a joint lead presenter for Channel 5 News. His final show was on 17 May 2022.

On 26 May 2022, the BBC announced that Breakfast, along with the BBC News at Six and Ten will be revamped in June 2022 to include a completely new studio and presentation, as part of a wider rebrand of the BBC. Local regional programmes will also be revamped over the coming months to tie in with the regional BBC channels broadcasting in HD by the beginning of 2023.

It was announced on 8 July that Jon Kay would permanently replace Dan Walker after being a stand-in presenter for Breakfast.

Format
Between 06:00 and 09:00 on weekdays, the programme is simulcast on BBC News. During the simulcast, the sports news is at 06:10, 06:35, 07:35 and 08:35. In addition, live sports bulletins are broadcast from sporting locations, such as Royal Ascot and Wimbledon, with the presenter interviewing key sporting figures. Business updates are presented at 06:10, when the main business stories from the newspapers are also discussed, and then at 20 minutes and 50 minutes past the hour, either from the studio, or out on location. The United Kingdom weather forecast is at 10 minutes and 40 minutes past the hour throughout the programme, either from the BBC Weather Centre in Broadcasting House, or out on location. Short (approximately four minutes) regional news, travel and weather bulletins broadcast just before the hour and the half-hour throughout the programme. Once the BBC News Channel breaks away for its own programming (starting from BBC News at Nine) at 09:00, the programme is extended until 09:15 on BBC One.

The programme is shortened to three hours on bank holidays but still features regional news updates, and is fully simulcast on the BBC News Channel.

During weekends, there are no updates from regional news bureaus. The first and/or second hour of the weekend edition may occasionally feature abridged versions of the BBC's other programmes such as Click, Reporters (shown in full at 6:30 on Sundays), Newswatch (shown on Saturdays at 7:45), The Travel Show and the Film Review. They also have a paper review with guests, and Paul Lewis normally discusses business or personal finance news. The show is also simulcast on BBC One and the BBC News Channel, but, during the Premier League season, BBC One regularly breaks away on Sundays to show the previous night's edition of Match of the Day.

Sports presenters are traditionally seated towards the end of the sofa, whereas business items are usually given from a standing or seated position located some distance from the main presenters. However, both sports and business news were presented from the satellite standing position.

Interactive
Breakfast encourages viewer response and interaction via e-mail, Facebook and Twitter.Contact us BBC News, 28 May 2010 Video reports and interviews from the programme are made available on the Breakfast Facebook page after transmission.

 Current on-air team Main presenters'''Note: Sunday editions of BBC Breakfast are presented by two of the regular stand-in presenting team Stand-in presenters 

 Business presenters 

 Sports presenters 

 Weather presenters 

 Regular reporters 

 Regular BBC contributors 

 Former presenters 

 Main 

 Jeremy Bowen (2000–2002)
 Darren Jordon (2000–2001)
 Sarah Montague (2000–2001)
 Sophie Raworth (2000–2002)
 Bill Turnbull (2001–2016)
 Sian Williams (2001–2012)
 Natasha Kaplinsky (2002–2005)
 Dermot Murnaghan (2002–2007)
 Mishal Husain (2003–2006)
 Susanna Reid (2006–2014)
 Louise Minchin (2012–2021)
 Dan Walker (2016–2022)

 Stand-in and guest 

 Julie Etchingham (2000–2001)
 Michael Peschardt (2000–2007)
 Noel Thompson (2000–2009)
 Rob Bonnet (2000–2005)
 Tanya Beckett (2001–2003)
 Susanna Reid (2001–2006)
 Louise Minchin (2001–2012)
 Jules Botfield (2002–2006)
 Chris Eakin (2002–2005)
 Ben Geoghegan (2002–2008)
 Jane Hill (2002–2004)
 Jon Sopel (2002–2010)
 Tim Willcox (2002–2004)
 Stephen Cole (2003–2004)
 Joanna Gosling (2003–2006)
 Simon McCoy (2004–2015)
 Kate Silverton (2005–2011)
 Sarah Campbell (2005–2006, 2023)
 Julian Worricker (2006)
 Charlie Stayt (2006–2007)
 Chris Hollins (2008–2012)
 Sonia Deol (2008–2009)
 Naga Munchetty (2009–2014)
 Jon Kay (2009–2022)
 Robert Hall (2009)
 Nicholas Owen (2009–2013)
 Julia Somerville (2010)
 Clive Myrie (2010)
 Simon Jack (2010–2011)
 Victoria Derbyshire (2011, 2022)
 Adam Parsons (2011–2013)
 Sally Nugent (2011–2021)
 Fiona Armstrong (2012)
 Sian Lloyd (2012–2017)
 Steph McGovern (2012–2019)
 Tim Muffett (2012–2013)
 John Maguire (2014–2018)
 Christian Fraser (2014–2019)
 Katherine Downes (2014–2022)
 Chris Mason (2017–2022)
 Babita Sharma (2018–2019)
 Martin Geissler (2020)

 Sports 
 Rob Bonnet (2000–2005)
 Sue Thearle (2000–2008)
 Chris Hollins (2005–2012)
 Katherine Downes (2012–2021)
 Ore Oduba (2013–2016)

 Business 
 Declan Curry (presenter 2000–2008)
 Max Foster (presenter and newsreader 2001–2005)
 Aaron Heslehurst (presenter 2008–2011)
 Simon Jack (presenter 2008–2011)
 Maryam Moshiri – (relief 2008–2011)
 Steph McGovern (presenter 2011–2019)
 Ben Thompson (presenter 2012–2021)

 Weather 
 Isobel Lang (presenter 2000–2006)
 Louise Lear (presenter 1998–2007)
 Helen Willetts (presenter 2000–2008)
 Alex Deakin (presenter 2007–2016)
 Ben Rich (presenter 2010–2011)

 Newsreaders 
 Kate Sanderson (2000–2004, occasional stand-in main presenter)
 Gillian Joseph (2004–2005, occasional stand-in main presenter)
 Louisa Preston (relief newsreader 2004–2006)
 Moira Stuart (2000–2006)
 Suzanne Virdee (relief newsreader 2004–2006)

 Editorial team 

Richard Frediani is the current editor of BBC Breakfast. He took on the role in September 2019 after being appointed in July 2019. He replaced Adam Bullimore, who had held the role since 2013. Bullimore was previously the deputy editor for five years. Alison Ford, previously the UK Editor for BBC Newsgathering, was the editor of the programme until her death in July 2013. Her appointment followed the departure of David Kermode to 5 News.

 Regular guests 
BBC Breakfast has a regular panel of experts who appear to provide specialist insight or analysis into news stories when they are required. In addition, the newspaper review on the weekends have a regular guest to provide commentary.

 Justin Urquhart Stewart (business expert)
 Kevin Maguire (political journalist)
 Andrew Pierce (political journalist)
 Dr. Rangan Chatterjee (doctor)
 Dr. Rosemary Leonard (doctor)
 Linda Papadopoulos (psychologist)
 Cary Cooper (psychologist)
 Ian McMillan (poet)
 Sally Hitchiner (vicar)
 Nazir Afzal (former Chief Crown Prosecutor)
Simon Calder (travel expert)
Bobby Seagull (maths expert)
Peter Bradshaw (author and film critic)

 Out of studio broadcasts 

Presenters make on-location broadcasts for particularly significant events.

The day after the September 11 attacks in New York City, Jeremy Bowen presented live near Ground Zero.

Dermot Murnaghan presented from Washington, D.C. to cover the 2004 US election. Bill Turnbull did the same for the 2008 US presidential election.

In the aftermath of the 7 July 2005 London bombings, Bill Turnbull presented live from King's Cross.

Sian Williams reported live from the scene of the Indian Ocean earthquake in 2005.

Dermot Murnaghan presented from the 2006 election campaign from Bristol.

In September 2009, Kate Silverton presented from Lashkargāh, Afghanistan. The programme would return to Afghanistan on 27 and 28 June 2014, when Bill Turnbull presented from Camp Bastion to celebrate Armed Forces Day.

Bill Turnbull presented live from Brighton for the September 2009 Liberal Democrats Conference, while Sian Williams presented from the Labour and Conservative Party Conferences.

Susanna Reid presented from the 2010 Academy Awards Ceremony.

On 6 April 2010, Sian Williams presented from Westminster in the run-up to the announcement of the 2010 General Election.

During April and May 2010, Bill Turnbull presented and reported from various locations on the party campaign trail throughout the country.BBC News – General Election 2010: Making It Clear  TV Throng, 5 April 2010

On 30 April 2010, Charlie Stayt presented the programme from the University of Birmingham following the final leaders' debate of the election campaign.

On 12 May 2010, Sian Williams presented the programme from College Green, Westminster the day after David Cameron became Prime Minister. Bill Turnbull also presented from outside 10 Downing Street.

Following the Cumbria shootings the previous day, Bill Turnbull presented live from the town of Whitehaven on 3 June 2010.

Bill Turnbull presented on the progress of the Olympic Park in Stratford, East London on 27 July 2010, two years before the Opening Ceremony of the 2012 Summer Olympics. Chris Hollins presented the sports news from the same location.

Bill Turnbull presented from the September 2010 Liberal Democrats conference in Liverpool and the Labour Conference in Manchester.

Sian Williams presented from the October 2010 Tory Conference in Birmingham. He additionally presented from College Green, Westminster in anticipation of the unveiling of Chancellor George Osborne's spending review and at the unveiling itself, both in October 2010.

On 19 May 2012, Louise Minchin presented the 1st day of the 2012 Olympics Torch Relay from Lands End with Charlie Stayt presenting from the BBC Breakfast studio.

From 27 July to 12 August, BBC Breakfast rebranded (as it usually does with all Olympics) to Olympic Breakfast and presented from a temporary studio built for the 2012 Olympics with a view of the Queen Elizabeth Olympic Park in the background

A special split edition of the programme aired for the wedding of Prince William and Kate Middleton, with Sian presenting from Westminster Abbey and Bill live from Buckingham Palace. Naga Munchetty would later present from Windsor Castle to mark the wedding of Prince Harry and Meghan Markle.

On 17 April 2013, Charlie Stayt presented the show from St Paul's Cathedral, London for a special split edition in the build-up of the funeral of Baroness Margaret Thatcher.

On 13 March 2015, Bill Turnbull presented from St Paul's Cathedral, London in the lead up to a special service of remembrance to mark the end of operations in Afghanistan.

On 12 June 2016, Louise Minchin presented from outside Buckingham Palace in the lead up to the finale of the Queen's 90th Birthday celebrations.

Naga Munchetty presented from outside the Palace of Westminster covering the aftermath of the United Kingdom's European Union membership referendum results.

Charlie Stayt and Sally Nugent presented live from Westminster the day after the 2017 terror attack.

During a special edition focusing on the Manchester terror attack that took place the previous night, Louise Minchin presented from outside Manchester Arena where the attack happened, and Dan Walker presented in the studio.

Naga Munchetty presented from Borough Market in the aftermath of the London Bridge terror attack.

Charlie Stayt and Louise Minchin spoke to MPs in Westminster on 10 June 2017 about the hung Parliament result from 8 June.

Naga Munchetty and Charlie Stayt presented a special on the Grenfell Tower fire that happened during the night, followed by a broadcast the next day with Charlie live from West London and Naga in the studio talking to people.

On 13 December 2018, Naga Munchetty and Charlie Stayt presented live from College Green, Westminster focusing on the unsuccessful vote of no confidence in Prime Minister Theresa May by Conservative Party MPs.

Charlie Stayt and Steph McGovern presented live from Endcliffe Park in Sheffield when a flypast took place for the 75th anniversary of the "Mi Amigo" crash.

On 17 April 2021 Charlie Stayt presented BBC Breakfast from Windsor Castle on the day of Prince Philip, Duke of Edinburgh funeral with Naga Munchetty presenting the show from the studio.

On 19 September 2022 Jon Kay and Sally Nugent presented BBC Breakfast from Westminster Abbey on the day of Queen Elizabeth II funeral.

On 24 October 2022 Jon Kay presented BBC Breakfast from Downing Street on the day Rishi Sunak became Prime Minister of the United Kingdom, while Victoria Fritz presented in the studio.

 Video podcast 
In September 2006, Breakfast launched its own video podcast called the Breakfast Takeaway. BBC News had already launched three other services: Newsnight, the Ten O'Clock News and STORYFix (also previously shown on television at weekends on News 24). The Breakfast Takeaway was available Monday to Friday in MP4 format where it could be downloaded and viewed from a home or office computer.

The video podcasts were a one-year trial. After the BBC reviewed the trial, the podcasts were discontinued in July 2007.

 Specials 
In 2003, the Breakfast production team was commissioned by BBC One to make a week long series called The Day Team From Chatsworth, presented by Nicki Chapman and presenter of the BBC's Countryfile programme, John Craven. It took a behind-the-scenes look at the stately home Chatsworth House, and was broadcast separately on BBC One at 10:30am.

A number of other guests or celebrity presenters have been used on Breakfast to present themed days or weeks, even though some have never been mainstream news reporters or presenters. Many of these have seen the programme extended to 9:30am.
 Alistair Appleton: Tate Modern 2004, Bath, Somerset 2003
 Chris Beardshaw: Chelsea Flower Show 2006
 Jennie Bond: Buckingham Palace 2004
 Nicki Chapman: Children in Need November 2005, London Fashion Week 2004, Chelsea Flower Show 2006
 Philippa Forrester: Alder Hey Children's Hospital 2002
 Andi Peters: Neighbours set 2005, EastEnders/Albert Square outside broadcast 2006
 Gaby Roslin: Wimbledon Tennis Championships outside broadcast 2002
 Tim Wonnacott: Christie's Auction Room 2004

 Awards 
 In March 2006, Breakfast won the TRIC award for best daytime television programme for the third year in a row.
 The show was nominated for a National Television Award in the Topical Magazine Programme category in 2011, but lost out to ITV's This Morning.''
 In 2021, sports presenter Sally Nugent's interview with Marcus Rashford regarding free school meals won Scoop of the Year at the Royal Television Society Television Journalist awards.

See also

 Breakfast television
 Today (BBC Radio 4)

References

External links
 
 

BBC television news shows
2000 British television series debuts
2010s British television series
2020s British television series
English-language television shows
Breakfast television in the United Kingdom
British television news shows
BBC News